The 1973 European Judo Championships were the 22nd edition of the European Judo Championships, and were held in Madrid, Spain on 13 May 1973. Championships were subdivided into six individual competitions, and a separate team competition.

Medal overview

Individual

Teams

Medal table

External links 
 Results of the 1973 European Judo Championships (JudoInside.com)

E
European Judo Championships
Judo
Judo competitions in Spain
Sports competitions in Madrid
1970s in Madrid
International sports competitions hosted by Spain
May 1973 sports events in Europe